Geoff Tyson (also referred to as Jeff Tyson) played guitar for T-Ride, whose debut album shared the same title. He was a student of Joe Satriani, and one of two students Satriani has said 'Graduated' from his lessons (the other being Steve Vai).  Songs from the album were used in various motion pictures and television shows including Luxury Cruiser in the soundtrack of 1992's Encino Man, Zombies from Hell in the movie Captain Ron and Bone Down in an episode of Baywatch, Forbidden Paradise-part 2. T-Ride toured the world with Ugly Kid Joe, Joe Satriani, White Zombie, Tora Tora and Asphalt Ballet.

Tyson went on to perform and record with Snake River Conspiracy and toured with Filter, Monster Magnet, Queens Of The Stone Age and A Perfect Circle.

In 2003, Tyson created the band Stimulator with singer Susan Hyatt, and they signed a record deal with Universal Music in 2005. Stimulator had songs featured in the Walt Disney Movie "Ella Enchanted", MTV's The Real World and episodes of the E! Network's "50 Hottest Hollywood Hookups". Stimulator toured the world with Duran Duran, The Go-Go's and were featured performers on the Warped Tour. 

According to Steve Ouimette, Tyson along with Ed DeGenaro is one of the featured guitarists in his cover version of "The Devil Went Down to Georgia" in the video game Guitar Hero III: Legends of Rock.

Tyson lives in Prague, Czech Republic where the Geoff Tyson band has been playing festivals all over Europe.

He is also the FOH audio mixer for bands touring all over the US and Europe, including the band Goblin.

Tours and Shows
 Geoff Tyson Band/Nazareth European tour (2009)
 Stimulator: Duran Duran, Stimulator (2005)
 The Go-Go's, Stimulator (2005–2006)
 The Warped Tour (2004)
 With Snake River Conspiracy: Filter, Faruka Salt, Snake River Conspiracy (1999)
 Queens Of The Stone Age, Monster Magnet, Snake River Conspiracy (2000)
 A Perfect Circle, Snake River Conspiracy (2000–2001)
 With T-Ride: Ugly Kidd Joe, T-Ride (1993)
 Joe Satriani, T-Ride (1994)
 Tora Tora, Asphalt Ballet, T-Ride (1992)

References

American rock musicians
Year of birth missing (living people)
Living people
Place of birth missing (living people)